Yeşil (green in turkish) may refer to:

 Mahmut Yıldırım (born 1953), Turkish contract killer also known as "Yeşil"
 Samed Yeşil (born 1994), German-Turkish footballer
 Yeşilırmak River, a river in northern Turkey

Turkish-language surnames